Peter Gustaf Tengmalm (29 June 1754 – 27 August 1803) was a Swedish physician and naturalist.

Tengmalm was born in Stockholm and studied medicine at Uppsala University. He spent his spare time studying birds and became an accomplished taxidermist. He graduated in 1785 and moved to the town of Eskilstuna, where he worked as the provincial medical officer. In 1792 he travelled to Scotland and England, meeting other naturalists including Joseph Banks, and returning to Stockholm in the following year.

Tengmalm then became medical officer for Västmanland. He contributed papers on both medicine and ornithology to the Royal Swedish Academy of Sciences, becoming a member in 1797. He died of dysentery, which he caught from his patients during an epidemic.

Tengmalm was interested in owls and improved upon Linnaeus' owl classification in a paper to the Academy of Sciences. Johann Friedrich Gmelin named an owl after him in 1788 (Strix tengmalmi) in the mistaken belief that Tengmalm had been the first to describe it. It has since been renamed Aegolius funereus, but the common name, Tengmalm's owl, persists.

References
Mearns and Mearns - Biographies for Birdwatchers 

1754 births
1803 deaths
Physicians from Stockholm
Swedish naturalists
18th-century Swedish physicians
Members of the Royal Swedish Academy of Sciences
Age of Liberty people